''Joker'' Thulasi (15 March 1950 – 10 May 2021) was an Indian actor, who worked in Tamil film and television industry. Thulasi made his acting debut in the Tamil film Ungalil Oruthi directed by Devaraj-Mohan released on 11 April 1976, and was a veteran stage actor and film actor for decades. He appeared in some well-known films such as Thamizhachi, Ilaignar Ani, Udan Pirappu, Avathara Purushan, and Mannai Thottu Kumbidanum. His performances in many films were lauded especially in Thirumathi Palanisamy which was one of the best films of the year 1992.

Early life 
He was born in Chennai, Tamil Nadu. In his early years, he became a stage actor. He was the first actor in the Kanmani theatre troupe in Chennai. Since then, he made his film debut in the Ungalil Oruthi movie.

Film career 
Thulasi made his lead actor debut in the Tamil film “Maruthu Pandi” along with Ramki and Seetha, directed by Manoj Kumar.

Television career 
Thulasi had supporting roles in Tamil television serials, including such notable serials as:

 Kolangal
 Vani Rani
 Keladi Kanmani
 Megala
 Muthaaram
 Kasthuri  
 Naanal 
 Madhavi 
 Azhagu

Filmography 
This is a partial filmography. You can expand it.

References

External links 
 

1950 births
2021 deaths
Indian male film actors
Tamil male actors
Male actors from Chennai
Deaths from the COVID-19 pandemic in India